Joan Albert Farré Santuré  (born 1968) is an Andorran politician. He is a member of the Liberal Party of Andorra.  He was a member of the General Council of Andorra from 2001 to 2009.

External links

Page at the General Council of the Principality of Andorra

Members of the General Council (Andorra)
1968 births
Living people
Liberal Party of Andorra politicians
Date of birth missing (living people)
21st-century Andorran politicians